Bomberman Kart is a kart-racing video game for PlayStation 2 and mobile phones starring the Bomberman characters. It is similar to Nintendo's Mario Kart series. The game supports 4 player local multiplayer using the PlayStation 2 Multitap. The first version was released in 2001 in Japan and later 2002 in Europe. The second version, called Bomberman Kart DX  was released in 2004 only in Japan.

Gameplay
In Bomberman Kart, the players can pick the characters separately from their vehicles. All power-ups are scattered around the track, including bombs, rockets (homing or wall bouncing ones) and boosts.

Reception

Bomberman Kart DX
Bomberman Kart DX is a redesigned version with improved graphics, new tracks, new racing modes and extras: manga artworks, a customizable traditional 4-player bomberman game and a 2-player co-op dungeon crawling adventure. The DX version removed the 4-player GP racing option and local multiplayer in this mode is now limited to 2 players. It also features downloadable content expansion packs adding more races (the PS2 HDD and Network Adaptor are required).

References

External links
Official website

2001 video games
Kart
Kart racing video games
Mobile games
PlayStation 2 games
PlayStation 2-only games
Racing video games
Racjin games
Multiplayer and single-player video games
Video games developed in Japan
Hudson Soft games